YZG or yzg may refer to:

 YZG, the IATA code for Salluit Airport, Quebec, Canada
 yzg, the ISO 639-3 code for E'ma Buyang language, Yunnan Province, China